The Pershing Cup is contested between the rugby union teams of Romania ("The Oaks") and United States ("The Eagles"). 

The cup is named after  US Army General John J. Pershing, for organizing the Inter-Allied Games, where a Romanian team, selected from members of the military, played the first ever international test for Romania, the first match being played against the americans.

The Pershing Cup is contested each time USA and Romania meet in a senior international match. The holder retains the cup unless the challenger wins the match in normal time.

The cup was established in 2014 by the action of the  FRR. The trophy has been contested three times since then, all in international test matches.

Previous winners

Total wins:
 USA: 2
 Romania: 1
 Draws: 0

In the event of a draw, the previous winner retains the trophy.

References

Sources

Rugby football
 
Romania national rugby union team
Rugby union international rivalry trophies